This article contains a list of the first appearances of significant artifacts, characters,  locations, species and teams in Marvel Comics, its predecessors Timely Comics and Atlas Comics, and imprints.

List

See also
 Features of the Marvel Universe
 Goblin (Marvel Comics)
 Hidden races (Marvel Comics)
 List of alien races in Marvel Comics
 List of Marvel Comics mutates
 List of Marvel Comics Golden Age characters
 List of Marvel Comics publications
 List of Marvel Comics superhero debuts
 List of Marvel Comics teams and organizations
 List of monsters in Marvel Comics
 List of superhero debuts
 Multiverse (Marvel Comics)
 Publication history of Marvel Comics crossover events
 Vampire (Marvel Comics)

Notes

References

External links
Appendix to the Handbook of the Marvel Universe features only obscure characters
Marvel Comics official site
Marvel Directory
Marvel Guide: An Unofficial Handbook of the Marvel Universe

Comic book publication histories
Lists of Marvel Comics characters
List of first